Benzil (i.e. Bz2, systematically known as 1,2-diphenylethane-1,2-dione) is the organic compound with the formula (C6H5CO)2, generally abbreviated (PhCO)2. This yellow solid is one of the most common diketones.  Its main use is as a photoinitiator in polymer chemistry.

Structure 
The compound's most noteworthy structural feature is the long carbon-carbon bond of 1.54 Å, which indicates the absence of pi-bonding between the two carbonyl centers.  The PhCO centers are planar, but the pair of benzoyl groups are twisted with respect to the other with a dihedral angle of 117°.  In less hindered analogues (glyoxal, biacetyl, oxalic acid derivatives), the (RCO)2 group adopts a planar, anti-conformation.

Applications 
Most benzil can be used as a photoinitiator in the free-radical curing of polymer networks. It absorbs ultraviolet radiation at a wavelength of 260 nm, leading to decomposition with formation of free-radical species and formation of cross-links within the material. However, it is a relatively poor photoinitiator, and is seldom used. It undergoes photobleaching, which allows the curing light to reach deeper layers of the material on longer exposure. Acetal derivatives, such as 2,2-dimethoxy-2-phenylacetophenone, have better properties for this application.

Benzil is a potent inhibitor of human carboxylesterases, enzymes involved in the hydrolysis of carboxylesters and many clinically used drugs.

Reactions 
Benzil is a standard building block in organic synthesis. It condenses with amines to give diketimine ligands.  A classic organic reaction of benzil is the benzilic acid rearrangement, in which base catalyses the conversion of benzil to benzilic acid. This reactivity is exploited in the preparation of the drug phenytoin. Benzil also reacts with 1,3-diphenylacetone in an aldol condensation to give tetraphenylcyclopentadienone.

Preparation 
Benzil is prepared from benzoin, for example with copper(II) acetate:
PhC(O)CH(OH)Ph  +  2 Cu2+  →  PhC(O)C(O)Ph  +  2 H+  + 2 Cu+

Other suitable oxidizing agents such as nitric acid (HNO3) are used routinely.

Iron(III) chloride (FeCl3) can be used as an inexpensive catalyst for this chemical conversion.

References 

Aromatic ketones
Diketones